Lewis Derek Bradley (born 29 May 2001) is an English professional footballer who plays as a midfielder for Atherton LR.

Career
On 4 May 2019, Bradley made his debut, as a substitute, for Rochdale in a 4–0 EFL League One defeat against Charlton Athletic.

In February 2020 he joined Colne on loan making his debut for the club a few days later in a match against City of Liverpool.

In September 2020, he joined Bradford (Park Avenue) on loan until the end of October.

References

2001 births
Living people
Footballers from Stockport
Association football midfielders
English footballers
Rochdale A.F.C. players
Colne F.C. players
Bradford (Park Avenue) A.F.C. players
English Football League players
National League (English football) players